Blanking may refer to:
 Applying the silent treatment
 Blanking (metalworking), a metalworking process to form the rough shape of a sheet metal workpiece

Technology
 Blanking (video)
 Horizontal blanking interval
 Vertical blanking interval

See also
 Blank (disambiguation)